Ulovići is a village in the municipality of Brčko, Bosnia and Herzegovina. It used to be named Ulović.

Demographics 
According to the 2013 census, its population was 752.

References

Villages in Brčko District